The 2018–2019 Bryant Bulldogs men's basketball team represented Bryant University during the 2018–19 NCAA Division I men's basketball season. The Bulldogs were led by first-year head coach Jared Grasso, and played their home games at the Chace Athletic Center in Smithfield, Rhode Island as members of the Northeast Conference. They finished the season 10–20 overall, 7–11 in NEC play to finish in eighth place. As the No. 8 seed in the NEC tournament, they lost in the quarterfinals to Saint Francis (PA).

Previous season 
The Bulldogs finished the 2017–18 season 3–28, 2–16 in NEC play to finish in last place. They failed to qualify for the NEC tournament.

On February 12, 2018, head coach Tim O'Shea announced that he would retire at the end of the season. He finished at Bryant with a ten-year record of 96–210. On April 2, the school hired Iona assistant Jared Grasso as head coach.

Roster

Schedule and results

|-
!colspan=9 style=| Non-conference regular season

|-
!colspan=9 style=| NEC regular season

|-
!colspan=9 style=| NEC tournament

Source

References

Bryant Bulldogs men's basketball seasons
Bryant
Bryant
Bryant